Kostakis Pierides (born 2 April 1941) is a Cypriot former footballer who played as a forward and made four appearances for the Cyprus national team.

Career
Pierides made his debut for Cyprus on 3 December 1966 in a UEFA Euro 1968 qualifying match against Romania, where he scored the only goal for Cyprus in the 1–5 loss. He went on to make four appearances, scoring one goal, before making his last appearance in 1969.

Career statistics

International

International goals

Honours
 Cypriot First Division top goalscorer: 1964–65

References

External links
 

1940 births
Living people
Cypriot footballers
Cyprus international footballers
Association football forwards
Pezoporikos Larnaca players
Olympiakos Nicosia players
Cypriot First Division players
Digenis Akritas Morphou FC managers
Omonia Aradippou FC managers